Cheri Madsen (née Becerra; born September 27, 1976) is an American Paralympic wheelchair racing athlete.

Madsen is a Native American from the Omaha tribe. She grew up in Nebraska, graduating from Nebraska City High School in 1995. Aged three she lost the use of her legs due to an unknown viral infection in her spine. She took up wheelchair racing in 1994 and two years later qualified for the 1996 Paralympics. There, she competed in four events in classification T53, medaling in each. She participated in the 2000 Summer Paralympics in Sydney in the same four events, this time in T54, winning two gold and one silver medal. After that she semi-retired from competitions to build a family – she married Eric Madsen on June 2, 2001, and later gave birth to daughters Reese and Malayna. In 2007 her younger brother and father were killed in a car-train crash. Madsen returned to competitions in 2013 to honor her brother. She qualified for the 2013 IPC World Championships, 2015 Parapan American Games and 2016 Rio Paralympics, medaling on all occasions.

References

External links 
 
 

Paralympic track and field athletes of the United States
Athletes (track and field) at the 1996 Summer Paralympics
Athletes (track and field) at the 2000 Summer Paralympics
Athletes (track and field) at the 2020 Summer Paralympics
Paralympic bronze medalists for the United States
Paralympic silver medalists for the United States
Paralympic gold medalists for the United States
Living people
1976 births
Wheelchair racers at the 1996 Summer Olympics
Wheelchair racers at the 2000 Summer Olympics
American female wheelchair racers
Paralympic wheelchair racers
People with paraplegia
Medalists at the 1996 Summer Paralympics
Medalists at the 2000 Summer Paralympics
Sportspeople from Omaha, Nebraska
Track and field athletes from Nebraska
Omaha (Native American) people
Native American sportspeople
Medalists at the 2016 Summer Paralympics
Medalists at the 2020 Summer Paralympics
Paralympic medalists in athletics (track and field)
Medalists at the 2015 Parapan American Games
21st-century American women
20th-century Native American women
20th-century Native Americans
21st-century Native American women
21st-century Native Americans